Vintage clothing is a generic term for garments originating from a previous era, as recent as the 1990s. The term can also be applied in reference to second-hand retail outlets, e.g. in vintage clothing store. While the concept originated during World War I as a response to textile shortages,  vintage dressing encompasses choosing accessories, mixing vintage garments with new, as well as creating an ensemble of various styles and periods. Vintage clothes typically sell at low prices for high-end name brands. 

Vintage clothing can be found in cities at local boutiques or local charities, or on the internet, e.g. eBay and Etsy, or through digital second-hand shopping websites. Vintage fashion has seen a reemergence in popularity within the 21st century due to increased prevalence of vintage pieces in the media and among celebrities, as well as consumer interests in sustainability and slow fashion.

Definitions 
"Vintage" is a colloquialism commonly used to refer to all old styles of clothing. A generally accepted industry standard is that items made between 20 and 100 years ago are considered "vintage" if they clearly reflect the styles and trends of the era they represent. These clothing items come with a sense of history attached to them, which is one of the reasons they are valued by vintage enthusiasts. This sense of history allows consumers to express sentimental nostalgia for fashions of past eras and for aspects not common with modern items like craftsmanship.
Vintage items are considered different than antique, which is used to refer to items 100 years old or more. Retro, short for retrospective, or "vintage style," usually refers to clothing that imitates the style of a previous era. Reproduction, or repro, clothing is a newly made copy of an older garment. 

Clothing produced more recently is usually called modern or contemporary fashion.

Deadstock 
Deadstock refers to merchandise that was withdrawn from sale and warehoused without having been sold to a customer. This is due to the item no longer being in fashion or otherwise outdated or superseded. Such merchandise might once again be in demand and at such point can be returned to sale. Return to sale of fashion merchandise would make it vintage clothing. However, repurposing of deadstock in new products is one way to improve sustainability in the fashion industry.

Sizing 
In the United States, due to changes in clothing sizes, vintage sizes are often smaller than the corresponding contemporary size. For example, a garment from the 1970s labeled as Medium (M) might be similar in size to a 2010s Extra Small (XS). Vintage sewing patterns offer an option for those who want a historically accurate garment but cannot find one in their size.

Retail market 

Popular places to buy vintage clothing include charity-run second-hand clothing shops, thrift stores, consignment shops, garage sales, car boot sales, flea markets, antique markets, estate sales, auctions, vintage clothing shops and vintage fashion, textile or collectables fairs. 

With the rise of the digital world and social media, the consumption of Vintage clothing has rapidly expanded, with e-commerce websites leading to growth in consumer accessibility of vintage pieces. The internet has drastically increased the availability of specific and hard-to-get items and opened up prospective markets for sellers around the world. In the last 20 years, social media in particular has become the most popular medium for consumers to obtain information about, and interact with vintage fashion.

Popular places to acquire garments include online auctions (e.g. eBay), multi-vendor sites (e.g. Etsy), online vintage clothing shops, (eg. TheRealReal, ThredUp), specialist forums, and social media sites (eg. Facebook Marketplace, Depop), where consumers can like, share, and purchase vintage goods from their smartphones. Many vintage clothing shops with physical locations also sell their goods online.

Typically in the United States, vintage clothing shops can be found clustered in college towns and artsy neighborhoods of cities. In contrast to thrift stores that sell both vintage and contemporary used clothing, vintage clothing shops are usually for-profit enterprises, with the market mixed between small chains and independent stores. These stores typically range from 200 to 5,000 square feet in size, and will usually have a fitting room. Vintage clothing stores may obtain clothing from individuals in exchange for cash or store credit.

History 

Before the rise of industrial manufacture, construction of most articles of clothing required extensive hand labor. Clothing worn by farmers and laborers was more a matter of practicality than fashion. In order to maximize value, clothing was repaired when worn or damaged, sometimes with layers of patching. Used clothing, in reasonable condition, could be tailored for a new owner. When too tattered to repair, an article might have been taken down to scraps for use in a quilt or braided rag rug, or used as rags for cleaning or dusting.

During World War I, the United States launched a conservation campaign, with slogans such as "Make economy fashionable lest it become obligatory". One result was an approximate 10% reduction in wartime trash production.

Into the 20th and 21st centuries, vintage clothing has seen increased popularity throughout media and pop culture. The tides of popular fashion create demand for ongoing replacement of products with something that is new and fresh. Once known as secondhand clothing, is now seen as vintage clothing. This is due in part to increased visibility through media, film and television, and celebrity influence. In the past 20 years, vintage fashion has been featured in leading fashion and lifestyle magazines, including a 2011 publication of Marie Claire.  The popularity of period pieces within film and television has also contributed to trends of vintage fashion. The authentic portrayal of 1960s fashions in the 2007 award winning series Mad Men sparked a resurgence of glamour in consumer interest. This was reflected in a prevalence of 1950 and 60s fashions in 2010 runways, and increased sales at vintage shops. In the early 2000s, celebrities like Reese Witherspoon and Renee Zellweger brought vintage clothing into the media by wearing vintage pieces to red carpets.

In the past decade, vintage clothing has become part of the movement towards environmental sustainability and sustainable fashion, and is an aspect of slow fashion, a concept coined in 2007 by Kate Fletcher. Vintage fashion appeals to consumer interests of ethical clothing as it falls under categories of reusing, recycling and repairing items rather than throwing them away. 

Vintage shopping trends have also seen a transition to E-commerce, with the emergence of sites such as Depop, founded in 2011, ThredUp, founded in 2009, and TheRealReal, founded in 2011. 

Historically based sub-cultural groups like rockabilly and swing dancing played a part in the increased interest in vintage clothes. In Finland the vintage scene resulted in a registered non-profit organization called Fintage, from common interest in the preservation of material culture and the environment.

"Vintage inspired" and "Vintage style" 
Vintage clothing retains and increases in value due to the fact that it is genuinely from a past era. and allows the buyers to choose different styles from second-hand clothing. In addition, authentic garments are made one at a time, with enough attention to detail to create an item that has long lasting value. Vintage fashion can be understood as a response to fast fashion, in which garments are mass produced. Vintage shopping allow consumers to find unique pieces and create a sense of individuality.  

However, vintage clothing is often inaccessible and hard to find. Garments closely resembling original vintage (retro or antique) clothing are mass-produced to meet the demand of consumers for vintage clothing. An example of this are slip dresses that emerged in the early 1990s, a style that resembles a 1930s design, but upon examination will show that it only superficially resembles the real thing. 

These styles are generally referred to as "vintage style", "vintage inspired" or "modern vintage". They serve as a convenient alternative to those who admire an old style but prefer a modern interpretation or for those who cannot have access to vintage clothing. Sellers claim consumer advantage in that, unlike the original garments, they are usually available in a range of sizes and perhaps, colours and/or fabrics, and can be sold much cheaper.

Environmental Sustainability 
Vintage fashion is part of a larger movement of sustainable fashion, and falls under the category of slow fashion, which is direct response to increasing awareness of the environmental impacts of the fast fashion industry. Within the past 10 years, increased media coverage of environmental issues has led to increasing consumer interest in ethical clothing consumption, and vintage fashion specifically.

The fashion industry ranks as  the second most polluting industry in the world after the oil industry. Consequently, a trend in becoming more conscious and sustainable shoppers has emerged through the years. The interest and demand in vintage shopping has grown significantly. In 2020, the term “vintage fashion” was researched 35,000 times on Lyst. One way of reducing waste and limiting the negative impact of fashion on the environment is the reuse and recycling of clothes. Vintage stores make fashion more sustainable.  One used item purchased as opposed to one new one reduces CO2 emissions by 25% on average per use.

Sometimes vintage items are upcycled via changing the hemline or other features for a more contemporary look. Vintage items in poor condition are also salvaged for reuse as components in new garments. Throughout the world, used apparel is reclaimed and put to new uses.The textile recycling industry is able to process over ninety percent of the waste without the production of any new hazardous waste or harmful by product.

See also 
 Vintage (design)
 Thrift store chic
 Indie subculture
 Counterculture
 2010s fashion
 Sustainable fashion

Bibliography 
 Bamford, Trudie (2003). Viva Vintage: Find it, Wear it, Love it. Carroll & Brown. 
 Tolkien, Tracy (2000). Vintage: the Art of Dressing up. Pavilion.

References 

History of clothing
Fashion design
Reuse
Nostalgia